Galatea Aerodrome  is a small airfield located 4 Nautical miles (7.4 km) north northeast of Murupara township in the Bay of Plenty in the North Island of New Zealand.

Operational Information 
Runway Strength -  ESWL 5700
No lighting available

Sources 
NZAIP Volume 4 AD
New Zealand AIP (PDF)

Airports in New Zealand
Transport in the Bay of Plenty Region
Buildings and structures in the Bay of Plenty Region
Transport buildings and structures in the Bay of Plenty Region